Ingunn is a given name. Notable people with the given name include:

Ingunn Arnórsdóttir (12th century), Icelandic scholar
Ingunn Bollerud (born 1972), Norwegian cyclist
Ingunn Thomassen Berg, Norwegian handball player
Ingunn Foss (born 1960), Norwegian politician 
Ingunn Gjerstad (born 1963), Norwegian politician
Ingunn Ringvold (born 1979), Norwegian singer, musician and songwriter
Ingunn Hultgreen Weltzien (born 1986), Norwegian orienteering competitor and cross-country skier